RY Tauri is a young T Tauri star in the constellation of Taurus about  away, belonging to the Taurus Molecular Cloud. It is more massive than typical T Tauri stars, and may be an intermediate between this class and the Herbig Ae/Be star type.

Stellar system 
There was one suspected stellar companion to RY Tauri, a 14.81 magnitude object 2MASS J04215810+2826300 discovered in 2008 at a projected separation of 1500 AU. It was proven to be a background star not related to RY Tauri with Gaia data though.

Protoplanetary system
The star is surrounded by a protoplanetary disk discovered in 2006. The disk is massive at 0.3 and consists mostly of gas. The existence of a protoplanetary disk is disputed; the signal can also be attributed to the birth envelope partially disrupted by the young star. Also, polar jets were detected. The jets contain detectable amounts of oxygen and sulfur. 
A superjovian planet on a 0.2 AU orbit is suspected since 2021.

Variability 
RY Tauri varies in brightness. It is a highly (by 1.5 magnitudes) obscured Orion variable, producing fluctuations of brightness as the star shines through the inhomogeneities of the inner part of the protoplanetary disk. It also produces irregular brightening events with a duration of about a month and amplitude of one magnitude.
The light curve of RY Tauri varies by 2-3 magnitudes over a decade and by roughly one magnitude over a year. The star was gradually brightening during the 20th century, possibly changing the variability mechanism in the process.

References 

T Tauri stars
Circumstellar disks
Taurus (constellation)
283571
BD+28 645
020387
J04215740+2826355
Tauri, RY
Hypothetical planetary systems